Drosophila sui is a species of fruit fly in the genus Drosophila, described by Lin and Tseng in 1973.

It is endemic to Taiwan.

References

sui
Endemic fauna of Taiwan
Insects of Taiwan